Vana Vishesha Sthalangal are the Siva temples which are located in famous forest areas. The word  means "forest area" and  means "famous". These temples are located in Tamil Nadu State.

Vana Vishesha Sthalangal listed below:

 Kadambavanam – Madurai  
 Kundalivanam – Thiruvakkarai  
 Kudhavanam – Thiruvuchchathanam  
 Shanbagavanam – Thirunageswaram  
 Magizhavanam – Thiru needur 
 Midhuvanam – Nannilam  
 Maraivanam – Vedaranyam (Thirumaraikadu)  
 Madhavivanam – Thirumurugan  
 Poondi Vilvavanam – Thiruvadanai  
 Venuvanam – Thirunelveli

References

Shiva temples in Tamil Nadu
Lists of Hindu temples in India